Arntzen is a surname. Notable people with the surname include:

Andrea Arntzen (1875–1958), Norwegian nursing teacher
Andreas Arntzen (1777–1837), Norwegian politician
Andreas Arntzen (barrister) (1928–2012), Norgwegian barrister
Arthur Arntzen (politician) (1906–1997), Norwegian politician for the Labour Party
Arthur Arntzen (humorist) (born 1937), Norwegian journalist, humorist, actor and writer
Charles Arntzen, American plant molecular biologist
Haakon Arntzen, Canadian politician
Heinrich Arntzen (1894–unknown), German flying ace during World War I credited with 11 aerial victories
Holly Arntzen, Canadian singer, dulcimer player, and pianist
Jon Gunnar Arntzen (born 1951), Norwegian encyclopaedist
Karelius August Arntzen (1802–1876), Norwegian politician
Lloyd Arntzen (born 1927), Canadian jazz clarinettist, folk singer, and soprano saxophonist
Niels Arntzen Sem (1782–1859), Norwegian politician
Ole Arntzen (1910–1973), Norwegian businessman and resistance leader
Ole Arntzen Lützow (1801–1871), Norwegian politician
Ole Arntzen Lützow-Holm (1853–1936), Norwegian priest and Conservative Party politician
Orie Arntzen (1909–1970), American professional baseball pitcher
Sture Arntzen (born 1948), Norwegian trade unionist
Sven Arntzen (1897–1976), Norwegian barrister

See also
Arntzen de Besche, Norwegian business law firm employing more than 110 lawyers